The 2004 United States House of Representatives elections in Colorado were held on November 2, 2004, with all seven House seats up for election. The winners served from January 3, 2005, to January 3, 2007.

Overview

Colorado
United States House of Representatives
2004